Robert Allen Young (September 3, 1942 – June 17, 1995) was an American football offensive guard who played 16 seasons in the National Football League.

Pro career
He started his career with the Denver Broncos, playing five seasons. However, he is noted mainly for his career with the St. Louis Cardinals, where he and other Cardinal offensive linemen are credited with introducing modern weightlifting/powerlifting into the training regime of the NFL. He was named to two Pro Bowls (1978 & 1979) and was a first-team All-Pro selection in 1979 as well.  Young attended Howard Payne University. He was the older brother of three-time world powerlifting champion Doug Young.

Young competed in the inaugural World's Strongest Man contest in 1977, finishing second to weightlifter Bruce Wilhelm. He also finished 5th in the 1979 World's Strongest Man.

In 1986, he was inducted into the Howard Payne University Sports Hall of Fame for his playing career in football along with track and field.

Personal life
Young was born September 3, 1942 in Marshall, Texas to Richard and Laverne Young. He spent his childhood in Brownwood, Texas where he set the state (class 4A) shot put record in 1960. He played football at University of Texas (1960) but moved in 1961 to be closer to home (Howard Payne University).

After his pro career, Young coached in the USFL from 1982 to 1986 as an offensive line coach for the Houston Gamblers. He coached offensive line at University of Houston from 1987 to 1989, and for the Houston Oilers from 1990 to 1995. Known professionally as Bob, he was a giant man with a huge enthusiasm for food, fun, laughter and pranks. He was also an avid outdoorsman and loved to spend his time away from football playing golf and fishing.

Young died of a heart attack at age 52.

See also
 Other American Football League players

References

External links
NFL.com player page

1942 births
1995 deaths
American football offensive guards
Howard Payne Yellow Jackets football players
Denver Broncos (AFL) players
Denver Broncos players
St. Louis Cardinals (football) players
Houston Oilers players
National Conference Pro Bowl players
American powerlifters
American strength athletes
New Orleans Saints players
Players of American football from Texas
People from Marshall, Texas